The Missionary Sisters of St. Peter Claver are a Catholic religious congregation of women dedicated to serving the spiritual and social needs of the poor around the world, particularly in Africa. They were founded in Austria by Mary Theresa Ledóchowska in 1894 as a legacy of Peter Claver. Today they serve worldwide.

References 

Catholic female orders and societies
Catholic religious institutes established in the 19th century
Catholic missionary orders
1894 establishments in Austria
Religious organizations established in 1894